The Ipswich Improvement Act 1571 (13 Eliz. I c. 24) was an Act of the Parliament of England, which empowered the Ipswich Corporation to raise rates for paving the streets of Ipswich, Suffolk.

The Act 
The Act required landlords, owners or tenants to ensure that the street in front of their property was paved and kept clean. The headboroughs of the four wards of the town, as leet officer were charged with overseeing this and they could fine anyone who neglected their duty.

References

Citations

Notes 

History of Ipswich
Acts of the Parliament of England (1485–1603)
1571 in law
1571 in England